Luvua Airport  is an airstrip atop a mesa overlooking the Luvua River in Haut-Katanga Province, Democratic Republic of the Congo.

Built and used by the Orbital Transport und Raketen AG (OTRAG) until 1979 with the blessing and support of Mobutu then President of Zaïre (now Democratic Republic of the Congo). Many webpages and documentaries are available about this extraordinary experience.

See also

Transport in the Democratic Republic of the Congo
List of airports in the Democratic Republic of the Congo

References

External links
 FallingRain - Luvua Airport
 HERE Maps - Luvua
 OpenStreetMap - Luvua
 OurAirports - Luvua
 
OTRAG

Airports in Haut-Katanga Province